Mark Bo Chu (born May 12, 1989) is an Australian multidisciplinary artist and writer. His public murals are shown in Atlantic City and Melbourne, and he has held painting exhibitions in Melbourne, Shanghai and New York, often focusing on the human figure. Chu's 2013 debut solo show exhibited specimens of his own dandruff and in 2019 he undertook the Q Bank Gallery Residency in Queenstown, Tasmania. In contributions to scientific research, Chu has co-authored papers in Elsevier's Cognition (journal), the International Committee on Computational Linguistics Conference, the Association for Computing Machinery's Creativity and Cognition Conference, and the Association for Computational Linguistics.  In 2019 he graduated from the Santa Fe Institute's Complex Systems Summer School where he co-founded the aesthetics research collective Comp-syn who were 2021 European Commission STARTS Prize semifinalists. Chu is a past restaurant reviewer for The Age Good Food Guide. At thirteen years old he recorded as a piano soloist with the Melbourne Symphony Orchestra and was a 2005 keyboard finalist in the ABC Young Performers Awards. He is a fiction graduate of Columbia University's MFA and past winner of the engineering school's interdisciplinary design challenge. Chu's 2021 concept sculpture "The Giving Ox" was intentionally fixed at a price of zero dollars, with the owner instructed to live as generously as possible until passing on the work for the fixed price. Chu was a recipient of the MH Carnegie NFT Fellowship, through which he exhibited crime theory collectibles Crypto Crimz at the Sydney Contemporary Art Fair.

Mark Chu is the son of Chinese-Australia composer Chu Wanghua, and grandson of Chinese scholar and dissident Chu Anping. He lives in Melbourne with his partner Nell Pierce.

References 

1989 births
Living people
21st-century Australian writers
21st-century Australian painters
21st-century male artists
Australian pianists
Columbia University School of the Arts alumni
Australian people of Chinese descent
Artists from Melbourne
Australian male painters